Rocketfuel is the second studio album by the Dutch rockband Peter Pan Speedrock.

Track listing
"Rocketfuel"
"Megasdetitas"
"Now The Monkey's Coming Out Of The Sleeve"
"Goodyear"
"Supersucker"
"Saliva"
"Bucket Full Of Shit"
"Soulbug"
"Angeldust"
"Drumband"
"Punk's Dead"
"Monty Python's Flying Circus"
"Hosed"

External links
 
 Website of Peter Pan Speedrock local rockscene

Peter Pan Speedrock albums
Marista Records albums
1998 albums